Khushiyan is a comedy TV show written and directed by Kapil Kumar, broadcast on DD National in 2003–2004. The show stars Kanwaljit Singh in a lead role, with Amrapali Gupta playing his daughter, supported by Nupur Joshi, Neelu Kohli, Sushil Parashar, Dinesh Hingoo and others.

Cast 
 Kanwalijit Singh as Mahesh
 Amrapali Gupta as Khushi, Mahesh's daughter
 Nupur Joshi as Preeti
 Neelu Kohli as Charu, Preeti's mother
 Sushil Parashar as Preeti's father
Lata Sabharwal

References 

DD National original programming
Indian comedy television series
2003 Indian television series debuts
2004 Indian television series endings